Kenneth William Kennedy (10 May 1941 – 14 July 2022) was an Irish rugby union player who played hooker for Ireland and the British and Irish Lions. 

He was born in Rochester, Kent, England, the son of a Royal Navy doctor from Holywood, County Down. The family returned to Holywood, where he grew up. He attended Campbell College in Belfast, where he started playing rugby. He studied medicine at Queen's University Belfast, and played rugby for Queen's University RFC and Belfast club CIYMS.

He won his first cap for Ireland in 1965, and went on to win 45 caps over the next decade. He was selected for the 1966 British Lions tour to Australia and New Zealand, and won four test caps. He undertook post-graduate study in geriatric medicine at Guy's Hospital, which led to him joining London Irish in 1968, where he played his club rugby until 1980, captaining the side from 1976 to 1979. He was a squad player on the 1974 British Lions tour to South Africa, acting as the team's unofficial medical officer.

Outside of rugby, he worked as an orthopaedic physician  at St. Stephen's Hospital and St Mary Abbots Hospital, and was Medical Director of Rehabilitation at the Royal Star and Garter Hospital until 2003, after which he set up a sports injury clinic.

References

1941 births
2022 deaths
British & Irish Lions rugby union players from Ireland
Ireland international rugby union players
Irish Exiles non-playing staff
Irish rugby union players
Ulster Rugby players
London Irish players
Irish geriatricians